Dirk Skreber (b. 1961 in Lübeck, Germany) is a German artist who lives and works in New York City. He studied at the Kunstakademie Düsseldorf.

Exhibitions
Skreber has exhibited work at museums, institutions, and galleries around the world, including, but not limited to, Kulturhuset (Stockholm), Andrea Rosen Gallery (New York), Museum für Moderne Kunst (Frankfurt)], Centro de Arte Dos de Mayo (Madrid), Kunsthalle Düsseldorf, Joslyn Art Museum (Omaha), White Cube (London), Staatliche Kunsthalle Baden-Baden, Denver Art Museum and SkulpturenPark Köln.

His work has been exhibited at galleries including The Saatchi Collection, the collection of the Museum of Contemporary Art, Los Angeles, and the Collection of the Museum Frieder Burda in Baden-Baden

Skreber is currently represented by Friedrich Petzel Gallery (New York).

Awards
, Hamburger Bahnhof, Berlin, 2000

References

1961 births
Living people
20th-century German painters
20th-century German male artists
German male painters
21st-century German painters
21st-century German male artists
Artists from Lübeck
Kunstakademie Düsseldorf alumni
German contemporary artists